In video games, an open world is a virtual world in which the player can approach objectives freely, as opposed to a world with more linear and structured gameplay. While games have used open-world designs since the 1980s, the implementation in Grand Theft Auto III (2001) set a standard for the concept which has been used since.

Games with open or free-roaming worlds typically lack level structures like walls and locked doors, or the invisible walls in more open areas that prevent the player from venturing beyond them; only at the bounds of an open-world game will players be limited by geographic features like vast oceans or impassable mountains. Players typically do not encounter loading screens common in linear level designs when moving about the game world, with the open-world game using strategic storage and memory techniques to load the game world in a dynamic and seamless manner. Open-world games still enforce many restrictions in the game environment, either because of absolute technical limitations or in-game limitations imposed by a game's linearity.

While the openness of the game world is an important facet to games featuring open worlds, the main draw of open-world games is about providing the player with autonomy—not so much the freedom to do anything they want in the game (which is nearly impossible with current computing technology), but the ability to choose how to approach the game and its challenges in the order and manner as the player desires while still constrained by gameplay rules. Examples of high level of autonomy in computer games can be found in massively multiplayer online role-playing games (MMORPG) or in single-player games adhering to the open-world concept such as the Fallout series. The main appeal of open-world gameplay is that it provides a simulated reality and allows players to develop their character and its behavior in the direction and pace of their own choosing. In these cases, there is often no concrete goal or end to the game, although there may be the main storyline, such as with games like The Elder Scrolls V: Skyrim.

Gameplay and design 
An open world is a level or game designed as nonlinear, open areas with many ways to reach an objective. Some games are designed with both traditional and open-world levels. An open world facilitates greater exploration than a series of smaller levels, or a level with more linear challenges. Reviewers have judged the quality of an open world based on whether there are interesting ways for the player to interact with the broader level when they ignore their main objective. Some games actually use real settings to model an open world, such as New York City.

A major design challenge is to balance the freedom of an open world with the structure of a dramatic storyline. Since players may perform actions that the game designer did not expect, the game's writers must find creative ways to impose a storyline on the player without interfering with their freedom. As such, games with open worlds will sometimes break the game's story into a series of missions, or have a much simpler storyline altogether. Other games instead offer side-missions to the player that do not disrupt the main storyline. Most open-world games make the character a blank slate that players can project their own thoughts onto, although several games such as Landstalker: The Treasures of King Nole offer more character development and dialogue. Writing in 2005, David Braben described the narrative structure of current video games as "little different to the stories of those Harold Lloyd films of the 1920s", and considered genuinely open-ended stories to be the "Holy Grail we are looking for in fifth generation gaming". Gameplay designer Manveer Heir, who worked on Mass Effect 3 and Mass Effect Andromeda for Electronic Arts, said that there are difficulties in the design of an open-world game since it is difficult to predict how players will approach solving gameplay challenges offered by a design, in contrast to a linear progression, and needs to be a factor in the game's development from its onset. Heir opined that some of the critical failings of Andromeda were due to the open world being added late in development.

Some open-world games, to guide the player towards major story events, do not provide the world's entire map at the start of the game, but require the player to complete a task to obtain part of that map, often identifying missions and points of interest when they view the map. This has been derogatorily referred to as "Ubisoft towers", as this mechanic was promoted in Ubisoft's Assassin's Creed series (the player climbing a large tower as to observe the landscape around it and identify waypoints nearby) and reused in other Ubisoft games, including Far Cry, Might & Magic X: Legacy and Watch Dogs. Other games that use this approach include Middle-earth: Shadow of Mordor and The Legend of Zelda: Breath of the Wild. Rockstar games like GTA IV and the Red Dead Redemption series lock out sections of the map as "barricaded by law enforcement" until a specific point in the story has been  reached.

Games with open worlds typically give players infinite lives or continues, although some force the player to start from the beginning should they die too many times. There is also a risk that players may get lost as they explore an open world; thus designers sometimes try to break the open world into manageable sections. The scope of open-world games requires the developer to fully detail every possible section of the world the player may be able to access, unless methods like procedural generation are used. The design process, due to its scale, may leave numerous game world glitches, bugs, incomplete sections, or other irregularities that players may find and potentially take advantage of. The term "open world jank" has been used to apply to games where the incorporation of the open world gameplay elements may be poor, incomplete, or unnecessary to the game itself such that these glitches and bugs become more apparent, though are generally not game-breaking, such as the case for No Man's Sky near its launch.

Open world, sandbox games, and emergent gameplay
The mechanics of open-world games are often overlapped with ideas of sandbox games, but these are considered different terms. Whereas open world refers to the lack of limits for the player's exploration of the game's world, sandbox games are based on the ability of giving the player tools for creative freedom within the game to approach objectives, if such objectives are present. For example, Microsoft Flight Simulator is an open-world game as one can fly anywhere within the mapped world, but is not considered a sandbox game as there are few creative aspects brought into the game.

The combination of open world and sandbox mechanics can lead towards emergent gameplay, complex reactions that emerge (either expectedly or unexpectedly) from the interaction of relatively simple game mechanics. According to Peter Molyneux, emergent gameplay appears wherever a game has a good simulation system that allows players to play in the world and have it respond realistically to their actions. It is what made SimCity and The Sims compelling to players. Similarly, being able to freely interact with the city's inhabitants in Grand Theft Auto added an extra dimension to the series.

In recent years game designers have attempted to encourage emergent play by providing players with tools to expand games through their own actions. Examples include in-game web browsers in EVE Online and The Matrix Online; XML integration tools and programming languages in Second Life; shifting exchange rates in Entropia Universe; and the complex object-and-grammar system used to solve puzzles in Scribblenauts. Other examples of emergence include interactions between physics and artificial intelligence. One challenge that remains to be solved, however, is how to tell a compelling story using only emergent technology.

In an op-ed piece for BBC News, David Braben, co-creator of Elite, called truly open-ended game design "The Holy Grail" of modern video gaming, citing games like Elite and the Grand Theft Auto series as early steps in that direction. Peter Molyneux has also stated that he believes emergence (or emergent gameplay) is where video game development is headed in the future. He has attempted to implement emergent gameplay to a great extent in some of his games, particularly Black & White and Fable.

Procedural generation of open worlds 
Procedural generation refers to content generated algorithmically rather than manually, and is often used to generate game levels and other content. While procedural generation does not guarantee that a game or sequence of levels is nonlinear, it is an important factor in reducing game development time and opens up avenues making it possible to generate larger and more or less unique seamless game worlds on the fly and using fewer resources. This kind of procedural generation is known as worldbuilding, in which general rules are used to construct a believable world.

Most 4X and roguelike games make use of procedural generation to some extent to generate game levels. SpeedTree is an example of a developer-oriented tool used in the development of The Elder Scrolls IV: Oblivion and aimed at speeding up the level design process. Procedural generation also made it possible for the developers of Elite, David Braben and Ian Bell, to fit the entire game—including thousands of planets, dozens of trade commodities, multiple ship types and a plausible economic system—into less than 22 kilobytes of memory. More recently, No Man's Sky procedurally generated over 18 quintillion planets including flora, fauna, and other features that can be researched and explored.

History

20th century 
There is no consensus on what the earliest open-world game is, due to differing definitions of how large or open a world needs to be. Inverse provides some early examples games that established elements of the open world: Jet Rocket, a 1970 Sega electro-mechanical arcade game that, while not a video game, predated the flight simulator genre to give the player free roaming capabilities, and dnd, a 1975 text-based adventure game for the PLATO system that offered non-linear gameplay. Ars Technica traces the concept back to the free-roaming exploration of 1976 text adventure game Colossal Cave Adventure, which inspired the free-roaming exploration of Adventure (1980), but notes that it was not until 1984 that what "we now know as open-world gaming" took on a "definite shape" with 1984 space simulator Elite, considered a pioneer of the open world; Gamasutra argues that its open-ended sandbox style is rooted in flight simulators, such as SubLOGIC's Flight Simulator (1979/1980), noting most flight sims "offer a 'free flight' mode that allows players to simply pilot the aircraft and explore the virtual world". Others trace the concept back to 1981 CRPG Ultima, which had a free-roaming overworld map inspired by tabletop RPG Dungeons & Dragons. The overworld maps of the first five Ultima games, released up to 1988, lacked a single, unified scale, with towns and other places represented as icons; this style was adopted by the first three Dragon Quest games, released from 1986 to 1988 in Japan.

Early examples of open-world gameplay in adventure games include The Portopia Serial Murder Case (1983) and The Lords of Midnight (1984), with open-world elements also found in The Hobbit (1982) and Valhalla (1983). The strategy video game, The Seven Cities of Gold (1984), is also cited as an early open-world game, influencing Sid Meier's Pirates! (1987). Eurogamer also cites British computer games such as Ant Attack (1983) and Sabre Wulf (1984) as early examples.

According to Game Informers Kyle Hilliard, Hydlide (1984) and The Legend of Zelda (1986) were among the first open-world games, along with Ultima. IGN traces the roots of open-world game design to The Legend of Zelda, which it argues is "the first really good game based on exploration", while noting that it was anticipated by Hydlide, which it argues is "the first RPG that rewarded exploration". According to GameSpot, never "had a game so open-ended, nonlinear, and liberating been released for the mainstream market" with The Legend of Zelda. According to The Escapist, The Legend of Zelda was an early example of open-world, nonlinear gameplay, with an expansive and cohesive world, inspiring many games to adopt a similar open-world design.

Mercenary (1985) has been cited as the first open world 3D action-adventure game. There were also other open-world games in the 1980s, such as Back to Skool (1985), Turbo Esprit (1986) and Alternate Reality: The City (1985). Wasteland, released in 1988, is also considered an open-world game. The early 1990s saw open-world games such as The Terminator (1990), The Adventures of Robin Hood (1991), and Hunter (1991), which IGN describes as the first sandbox game to feature full 3D, third-person graphics, and Ars Technica argues "has one of the strongest claims to the title of GTA forebear". Sierra On-Line's 1992 adventure game King's Quest VI has an open world; almost half of the quests are optional, many have multiple solutions, and players can solve most in any order. Atari Jaguar launch title, Cybermorph (1993), was notable for its open 3D polygonal-world and non-linear gameplay. Quarantine (1994) is an example of an open-world driving game from this period, while Iron Soldier (1994) is an open-world mech game. The director of 1997's Blade Runner argues that that game was the first open world three-dimensional action adventure game.

IGN considers Nintendo's Super Mario 64 (1996) revolutionary for its 3D open-ended free-roaming worlds, which had rarely been seen in 3D games before, along with its analog stick controls and camera control. Other 3D examples include Mystical Ninja Starring Goemon (1997), Ocarina of Time (1998), the DMA Design (Rockstar North) game Body Harvest (1998), the Angel Studios (Rockstar San Diego) games Midtown Madness (1999) and Midnight Club: Street Racing (2000), the Reflections Interactive (Ubisoft Reflections) game Driver (1999), and the Rareware games Banjo-Kazooie (1998), Donkey Kong 64 (1999), and Banjo-Tooie (2000).

1UP considers Sega's adventure Shenmue (1999) the originator of the "open city" subgenre, touted as a "FREE" ("Full Reactive Eyes Entertainment") game giving players the freedom to explore an expansive sandbox city with its own day-night cycles, changing weather, and fully voiced non-player characters going about their daily routines. The game's large interactive environments, wealth of options, level of detail and the scope of its urban sandbox exploration has been compared to later sandbox games like Grand Theft Auto III and its sequels, Sega's own Yakuza series, Fallout 3, and Deadly Premonition.

21st century 

Grand Theft Auto has had over 200 million sales. Creative director Gary Penn, who previously worked on Frontier: Elite II, cited Elite as a key influence, calling it "basically Elite in a city", and mentioned other team members being influenced by Syndicate and Mercenary.  Grand Theft Auto III combined elements from previous games, and fused them together into a new immersive 3D experience that helped define open-world games for a new generation. Executive producer Sam Houser described it as "Zelda meets Goodfellas", while producer Dan Houser also cited The Legend of Zelda: Ocarina of Time and Super Mario 64 as influences. Radio stations had been implemented earlier in games such as Maxis' SimCopter (1996), the ability to beat or kill non-player characters date back to titles such as Portopia (1983), and Valhalla (1983) and the way in which players run over pedestrians and get chased by police has been compared to Pac-Man (1980). After the release of Grand Theft Auto III, many games which employed a 3D open world, such as Ubisoft's Watch Dogs and Deep Silver's Saints Row series, were labeled, often disparagingly, as Grand Theft Auto clones, much as how many early first-person shooters were called "Doom clones".

Other examples include World of Warcraft, The Elder Scrolls and Fallout series of games, which feature a large and diverse world, offering tasks and possibilities to play.

In the Assassin's Creed series, which began in 2007, players explore historic open-world settings. These include the Holy Land during the Third Crusade in Assassin's Creed, Renaissance Italy in Assassin's Creed II and Brotherhood, Constantinople during the rise of the Ottoman Empire in Assassin's Creed Revelations, New England during the American Revolution in Assassin's Creed III, the Caribbean during the Golden Age of Piracy in Assassin's Creed IV: Black Flag, the North Atlantic during the French and Indian War in Assassin's Creed Rogue, Paris during the French Revolution in Assassin's Creed Unity, London at the onset of the Second Industrial Revolution in Assassin's Creed Syndicate, Ptolemaic Egypt in Assassin's Creed Origins, Classical Greece during the Peloponnesian War in Assassin's Creed Odyssey, and Medieval England and Norway during the Viking Age in Assassin's Creed Valhalla. The series intertwines factual history with a fictional storyline. In the fictional storyline, the Templars and the Assassins, two secret organisations inspired by their real-life counterparts, have been mortal enemies for all of known history. Their conflict stems from the Templars' desire to have peace through control, which directly contrasts the Assassins' wish for peace with free will. Their fighting influences much of history, as the sides often back real historical forces. For example, during the American Revolution depicted in Assassin's Creed III, the Templars initially support the British, while the Assassins side with the American colonists.

S.T.A.L.K.E.R.: Shadow of Chernobyl was developed by GSC Game World in 2007, followed by two other games, a prequel and a sequel. The free world style of the zone was divided into huge maps, like sectors, and the player can go from one sector to another, depending on required quests or just by choice.

In 2011, Dan Ryckert of Game Informer wrote that open-world crime games were "a major force" in the gaming industry for the preceding decade.

Another popular open-world sandbox game is Minecraft, which has since become the best-selling video game of all time, selling over 238 million copies worldwide on multiple platforms by April 2021. Minecrafts procedurally generated overworlds cover a virtual 3.6 billion square kilometers.

The Outerra Engine is a world rendering engine in development since 2008 that is capable of seamlessly rendering whole planets from space down to ground level. Anteworld is a world-building game and free tech-demo of the Outerra Engine that builds upon real-world data to render planet Earth realistically on a true-to-life scale.

No Man's Sky, released in 2016, is an open-world game set in a virtually infinite universe. According to the developers, through procedural generation, the game is able to produce more than 18 quintillion ( or 18,000,000,000,000,000,000) planets to explore. Several critics found that the nature of the game can become repetitive and monotonous, with the survival gameplay elements being lackluster and tedious. Jake Swearingen in New York said, "You can procedurally generate 18.6 quintillion unique planets, but you can't procedurally generate 18.6 quintillion unique things to do." Updates have aimed to address these criticisms.
  
In 2017, the open-world design of The Legend of Zelda: Breath of the Wild was described by critics as being revolutionary and by developers as a paradigm shift for open-world design. In contrast to the more structured approach of most open-world games, Breath of the Wild features a large and fully interactive world that is generally unstructured and rewards the exploration and manipulation of its world. Inspired by the original 1986 Legend of Zelda, the open world of Breath of the Wild integrates multiplicative gameplay, where "objects react to the player's actions and the objects themselves also influence each other." Along with a physics engine, the game's open-world also integrates a chemistry engine, "which governs the physical properties of certain objects and how they relate to each other," rewarding experimentation. Nintendo has described the game's approach to open-world design as "open-air".

See also 
 Persistent world

References

Further reading 
 
 Michael Llewellyn: 15 Open World Games More Mature Than Grand Theft Auto V. thegamer.com. April 24, 2017.

Emergent gameplay
Video game design
Video game gameplay
Video game terminology